The 1961 Colgate Red Raiders football team was an American football team that represented Colgate University as an independent during the 1961 NCAA University Division football season. In its third season under head coach Alva Kelley, the team compiled a 5–4 record. Kenneth Kerr was the team captain. 

The team played its home games at Colgate Athletic Field in Hamilton, New York.

Schedule

Leading players 
Statistical leaders for the 1961 Red Raiders included: 
 Rushing: Daniel Keating, 466 yards and 2 touchdowns on 104 attempts
 Passing: Daniel Keating, 495 yards, 35 completions and 4 touchdowns on 83 attempts
 Receiving: James Heilman, 191 yards and 2 touchdowns on 12 receptions
 Total offense: Daniel Keating, 961 yards (495 passing, 466 rushing)
 Scoring: James Heilman, 32 points from 4 touchdowns and 4 two-point conversions
 All-purpose yards: James Heilman, 713 yards (357 rushing, 264 receiving, 210 punt returning, 76 kickoff returning, 17 interception returning)

References

Colgate
Colgate Raiders football seasons
Colgate Red Raiders football